Mary "Molly" O'Sullivan, later Mary Carter, is a fictional character in a series of audio plays produced by Big Finish Productions based on the long-running British science fiction television series Doctor Who, played by Ruth Bradley (mainly) and Sorcha Cusack. An Irish Voluntary Aid Detachment nursing assistant in World War I, she is a companion of the Eighth Doctor.

Character history
Molly was born in 1891 and first appears in The Great War (2012). The Great War takes place during World War I, where she was in her twenties at the time. 

She was the daughter of Patrick and Cathy O'Sullivan, and a sister to seven siblings, all of whom she outlived. Two of her brothers and her three sisters died before their fifth birthdays. She had two other brothers, Patrick and Liam. Patrick joined the British Army in World War I and was killed on his first day in France, while Liam remained in Ireland but was killed by an English sentry.

On her second birthday, Molly became "lost in a storm", after which she returned home with unusually dark eyes. She was teased for her dark eyes when she was a child and when she first entered domestic service. However, this teasing ended when she began to punch the people who mocked her.

Before the outbreak of World War I, she worked as a chambermaid for the Donaldson family in Eaton Place in London. She became friends with the Donaldsons' daughter Kitty, who viewed her as being the sister that she never had. When Kitty became a VAD in France, Molly did likewise as she knew that Kitty needed someone to protect her. After several months of serving in France, Kitty contracted an infection from one of the soldiers whom she was treating. She was eventually killed by the renegade Time Lord Kotris and the Daleks. Molly met the Eighth Doctor in France, with whom she began to travel after they were chased across no man's land by the Daleks.

The first place the Doctor took Molly was Dunkirk in 1941. They were not there long before the Daleks appeared once more, chasing them across the town. They were also chased to London in 1972, as well as the planet Halalka.

Shortly after leaving Halalka, Molly and the Doctor seemingly arrived on Skaro, where they discovered that the Daleks had become peaceful after they caused the extinction of the Time Lords. However, it was later revealed that this was a simulation generated on their behalf.

The Doctor and Molly were directed to Srangor by the Time Lords, where Molly discovered that she had been implanted with retro-genitor particles by Kotris while she was lost during her second birthday, the effect of which gave Molly her unusually dark eyes. The effects of this were erased when Straxus — a younger version of Kotris — was killed, thus erasing Kotris and everything he accomplished from history.

She departed the TARDIS after it materialised in France during World War I. Molly realised that with Kotris having been erased from history, Kitty would still be alive and that she had to continue taking care of her as she promised.

Molly returned to London and stayed at 107 Baker Street. In 1918 she met the Doctor again, and they travelled to the cryo-ship Orpheus, where Molly met Liv Chenka for the first time. Shortly after, the ship came under attack by the Eminence, a gaseous entity and psychic force that could control the minds of any being it came into contact with, and it began to possess the crew. After defeating the Eminence, Molly and the Doctor were joined on their travels by Liv.

Molly, Liv and the Doctor's next stop was London in the 1970s, where Molly helped the Doctor defeat the Master and the Eminence. After they were defeated, Molly stayed behind in 107 Baker Street and awaited the Doctor's return from the human colony planet Nixyce VII. One night she heard a knock at the door and was kidnapped by the Master and his own companion, Sally Armstrong.

The Master edited Molly's memories, replacing the Doctor with the Master, creating a sense of trust between them. The Master then made her become part of his experiment to pass some of her retro-genitor particles onto other humans, so that they could fall under the Eminence's control, and allied himself with the Eminence, allowing both of them to conquer Earth. He subsequently activated the retro-genitor particles in the humans and asserted his psychic influence over them. The Master also used her to create the Grand Administrator of the Earth, Walter Vincent, based on her father. The Eighth Doctor helped a group of humans overcome the Master's influence and stopped his plans. Whilst the Celestial Intervention Agency erased his work from history, the Master escaped in his TARDIS. Afterwards, Molly parted company from the Doctor, after it was deemed she would be unsafe travelling with him, they parted ways as she was to be returned to her proper place in time.

In a new timeline created by the Daleks, she was in Moscow, 1961 where she was known under the name Mary Carter. While there, a Sontaran named Rastel ordered her to look after the Eighth Doctor. She didn't recognise him at first, but this was a deception, as the Master wanted her to stabilise the timeline. She knew that something was wrong with time when the Daleks invaded Earth as she had known the future.

The Dalek Time Controller took Liv and Molly to the Eye of Orion to see Markus Schriver's final experiment, which was the birth of the Eminence. She sacrificed her own life so that the Time Controller could die, as because of the retro-genitor particles, she was still linked with the Time Controller; if either of them died, they would both die. She then became part of the Eminence, and used the Time Controller's link with the time vortex to send the Eminence to the end of the universe.

Other appearances
The Eighth Doctor mentions Molly by name (along with other audio companions) before regenerating into the War Doctor in the 2013 mini-episode, "The Night of the Doctor". Molly was the last companion that he remembered.

References

External links

Doctor Who audio characters
Doctor Who spin-off companions
Fictional Irish people
Fictional nurses